NBA 2K8 is a 2007 basketball simulation video game developed by Visual Concepts and published by 2K Sports and Spike. It is the ninth installment in the NBA 2K franchise and the successor to NBA 2K7. It was released in 2007 for PlayStation 2, PlayStation 3, and Xbox 360. Chris Paul of the New Orleans Hornets is the cover athlete of the game. NBA 2K8 is the predecessor to NBA 2K9 in the NBA 2K series.

NBA 2K8 was well received upon release. Critics mostly praised the aesthetical details, particularly the player animations, as well as the game mode options, and overall gameplay, more specifically, the post play, jump shooting, and well rounded accessibility.

Gameplay
NBA 2K8 is a basketball simulation game which strives to emulate the National Basketball Association and the sport of basketball in general. Players mostly play NBA basketball games in a variety of game modes, with real teams and players or created players. One of the new additions to the game is the Slam Dunk Contest game mode. During games, Kevin Harlan is the play-by-play commentator, this is the last game in the NBA 2K series to have Kenny Smith as the color commentator, he would make a return in the pre-game and halftime shows of NBA 2K16,  and Craig Sager as the sideline reporter.

Development and release
Chris Paul is the cover athlete of NBA 2K8. The game features a soundtrack consisting of 23 licensed songs. The developers aimed to create genre diversity when composing the soundtrack.

NBA 2K8 was released for the PlayStation 2, PlayStation 3, and Xbox 360 video game consoles in North America on October 2, 2007.

Soundtrack
In 2006, J Dilla passed away since he and Madlib recorded the song, "The Official", from the 2003 album, Champion Sound. It was remixed for the game.

 J Dilla ft. Madlib - The Official (2K8 Mix)
 J Dilla ft. Q-Tip & Talib Kweli - Lightworks
 J Dilla ft. Common - E=MC2
 Run-D.M.C. - Sucker MC's
 Stone Roses - Fool's Gold
 Breakestra - Getcho Soul Together Pt. 2
 Fishbone - Skankin to the Beat
 Tommy Guerrero - Molotov Telegram
 Percee P - Throwback Rap Attack
 Quasimoto - Chrome Dreams
 Devo - Through Being Cool
 Quantic - When You're Through
 J. Rocc - Cold Heat Megamix
 Cut Chemist - Bunky's Pick
 Billy Ball & The Upsetters - Tighten Up Tighter
 The Highlighters Band - Funky 16 Corners
 A Guy Called Gerald - Hurry to Go Easy
 Sonic Trip - Energy Play
 Baron Zen - Turn Around (Peanut Butter Wolf Instrumental Mix)
 Finley Quaye - Ultra Stimulation
 G-Love & Special Sauce - Shooting Hoops
 Ernie & The Topnotes - Dap Walk
 The Fabulous Jades - Cold Heat

Reception

The PlayStation 3 and Xbox 360 versions of NBA 2K8 received "favorable" reviews, while the PlayStation 2 version received "average" reviews, according to the review aggregation website Metacritic.  In Japan, Famitsu gave the PS3 and Xbox 360 versions a score of one five, one seven, one five, and one seven for a total of 24 out of 40.

IGN's Hilary Goldstein said of the same console versions: "In many ways, NBA 2K8 is an improved game on the court. But there are a lot of minor issues that really drag it down. Over the course of my first dozen games, I was in love. But as the season wore on, the issues began piling up to a point that it became a source of frustration. The Lock-on D gaff is inexcusable and the lackluster defensive AI allows decent players to tear it up on offense. Jason Williams should not be dropping 30 points a game. Yet he won the MVP in year two of my franchise. Still, any hoops fan should give NBA 2K8 a look. It's certainly the best basketball game on any system this year. The Association is a solid franchise mode and, if [Virtual Concepts] can iron out its AI and gameplay issues, next year's model could be something very special."

1UP.com's Todd Zuniga commended the aesthetics, depth, game modes, and online features of the PS3 and Xbox 360 versions, but disliked certain gameplay imperfections that he deemed small and annoying, such as the unrealistic defensive abilities of big men when they are defending quick players. Aaron Thomas of GameSpot praised the same console versions for having a large amount of content, the CPU, and the new additions to the game. In his review for Game Revolution, Chris Andrien wrote of the same console versions: "At the end of the day, NBA 2K8 is a pretty fun jaunt." He spoke well of the sound effects, but hated the "goofy" commentary. He liked the addition of NBA legends such as Larry Bird, but disliked certain other gameplay additions, including the "unrealistic" lock-on defense. Lastly, Andrien praised the realistic visuals and animations, but criticized the "wonky" artificial intelligence.

GameTrailers complimented the same console versions' dunk contest game mode, praised the "incredible online" play, called the post play "the best in the biz", said the shooting felt "just right", and enjoyed the animations. However, the review cited several "quirks", such as AI issues, players unrealistically missing shots or attempting shots that wouldn't realistically be used, statistical problems, removed features, and the lock-on defense mechanic, as downsides. Lastly, the review also heavily criticized the designs of the players and the menus, calling them "awful" and "butchered", as well as the "repetitive" commentary, but did enjoy the soundtrack and said the amount of animations "makes a huge difference".

References

External links

2007 video games
2K Sports games
Multiplayer and single-player video games
8
PlayStation 2 games
PlayStation 3 games
Take-Two Interactive games
Video games developed in the United States
Video games set in 2007
Video games set in 2008
Xbox 360 games